The Association of Japanese Animations (AJA;) is an industry group consisting of 52 affiliate  animation production companies.

AJA's duties 

AJA's scope of duties are to work on various issues concerning the Japanese animation industry, which most members are a part of.

Most of AJA's members are small to medium-sized companies, hence the need for AJA to unite together to overcome some of the bigger problems, such as infringement of intellectual properties, rampant piracy and illegal file sharing has risen following the introduction and widespread adoption of P2P networking software.

Besides the aforementioned, AJA also serves to resolve conflicts, and provide improvements of the general production environment, talents and oversea operations.

AJA also releases annual reports on the anime industry. According to the 2017 report, overseas markets expanded 1.5 times the previous year to a record high. In terms of contracts, China placed first while the United States dropped to 4th place. In 2019, the United States placed first as Canada placed second in contracts.

Events 

AJA also organises events to promote the work of their members to the major distributor of licenses of other regions, R1 (US), R3 (SEA), R2 (UK), R4 (Aus) and so on, in bid to promote Japanese animation to the world.

One of their events is the biggest anime related event in Japan, the Tokyo International Anime Fair.

Since April 2014, the AJA took leadership of  an annual project first launched in 2010 by the Japanese Animation Creators Association and funded by the Japanese government's Agency for Cultural Affairs in order to support training animators. The project features a series of animated shorts produced by various animation studios each year. In 2012 it was renamed  and again in 2016 to Anime Tamago (あにめたまご, lit. "Anime Egg").

See also
Japanese Animation Creators Association

References

External links
Official site

Anime industry
Organizations established in 2002
Arts and media trade groups
2002 establishments in Japan
 Association of Japanese Animations